Nienburg (Saale) was a Verwaltungsgemeinschaft ("collective municipality") in the Salzlandkreis district, in Saxony-Anhalt, Germany. The seat of the Verwaltungsgemeinschaft was in Nienburg. It was disbanded on 1 January 2010.

The Verwaltungsgemeinschaft Nienburg (Saale) consisted of the following municipalities:

Former Verwaltungsgemeinschaften in Saxony-Anhalt